A Kock pouch is a continent pouch formed by the terminal ileum after colectomy.  The procedure was detailed and first performed in 1969 by Dr Nils Kock. 


Indications
Kock pouch ileostomy is indicated for patients who are unfit for ileal pouch anal anastomosis (IPAA) because the anus and anal sphincter will be removed during the operation; and patients who develop severe incontinence after IPAA.

A Kock pouch need not be created during the initial colectomy surgery.

Details
The pouch has a volume of 500ml to 1000ml so that feces can be stored temporarily and the patient need not carry a stoma bag. This improves the patient's quality of life. A valve is constructed by intussusception of the terminal ileum, thereby containing the stored feces.

References

Digestive system
Abdominal surgical procedures